is a Japanese swimmer, who specialized in freestyle events. She represented her nation Japan at the 2008 Summer Olympics, and has won a career total of two medals (one silver and one bronze) in a major international competition, spanning the Summer Universiade and the Pan Pacific Championships. She set a Japanese record of 54.43 in the 100 m freestyle at the 2009 Japan National Sports Festival in Nagaoka, Niigata. Yamaguchi is a student at Kinki University in Fukuoka.

Yamaguchi competed as an eighteen-year-old and a member of the Japanese team in two freestyle relay events at the 2008 Summer Olympics in Beijing. Despite missing out the individual spot in the 200 m freestyle, she managed to place fourth at the Olympic trials in Tokyo (2:01.64) to earn an outright selection on the relay squad. Teaming with Haruka Ueda, Maki Mita, and Emi Takanabe in the 4 × 200 m freestyle relay final, Yamaguchi swam the second leg with a split of 1:58.51, but the Japanese team had to settle for seventh place in 7:57.56. Yamaguchi also participated in the 4 × 100 m freestyle relay, along with Ueda, Mita, and Asami Kitagawa, but missed out the top 8 final by 0.08 of a second in a prelims time of 3:39.25.

In 2009, Yamaguchi earned a silver medal for the Japanese team in the 400 m freestyle relay at the Summer Universiade in Belgrade, Serbia with a final time of 3:42.60.

References

External links
 

1990 births
Living people
Olympic swimmers of Japan
Swimmers at the 2008 Summer Olympics
Swimmers at the 2016 Summer Olympics
Japanese female freestyle swimmers
People from Nagasaki
Asian Games medalists in swimming
Swimmers at the 2014 Asian Games
Universiade medalists in swimming
Asian Games silver medalists for Japan
Medalists at the 2014 Asian Games
Universiade silver medalists for Japan
Medalists at the 2009 Summer Universiade